Moothedan Thomas Jacob (born 6 January 1952) is an Indian Indian National Congress party politician who is serving as the chairman of the municipal council of the industrial town of Aluva, Kerala, India. He assumed office in November 2010.

References

External links
  Aluva Municipality official website

Malayali politicians
Indian National Congress politicians from Kerala
Living people
Indian Christians
People from Aluva
Politicians from Kochi
Year of birth missing (living people)